Kulayettikara  is a village in Ernakulam district in the Indian state of Kerala.

Demographics
 India census, Kulayettikara had a population of 6044 with 3019 males and 3025 females.

References

Villages in Ernakulam district